Semyon Mayevich Bychkov (born November 30, 1952) is a Soviet-born conductor.

Biography

Childhood and studies in Russia
Bychkov was born in Leningrad (now Saint Petersburg) to Jewish parents.  His younger brother was Yakov Kreizberg, also a conductor.  Bychkov studied at the Glinka Choir School for ten years before moving to the Leningrad Conservatory where he was a student of Ilya Musin. While at the Conservatory, Bychkov played volleyball for the Leningrad Dynamos. In 1973 he won the Rachmaninov Conducting Competition, but was denied the usual prize of conducting the Leningrad Philharmonic by the authorities after he applied for an exit visa. His family had suffered from official antisemitism and after expressing views critical of the Soviet regime he decided to leave the country in 1974, going first to Vienna with only $100 in funds.

Studies and career in the United States
In 1975, at age 22, he left Vienna and emigrated to the United States. Bychkov attended and graduated the  Mannes School of Music then becoming the director of the Mannes College Orchestra. From 1980 to 1985, Semyon Bychkov served as music director of the Grand Rapids Symphony in Grand Rapids, Michigan, and through his Mannes connection with fellow alumnus Julius Rudel became principal guest conductor of the Buffalo Philharmonic Orchestra. Again through his connection with Rudel, Bychkov made his debut conducting Carmen at the New York City Opera on September 30, 1981 (the run of 6 performances were his only appearances with that company).  On 4 July 1983, he became a United States citizen.  In 1985, he became music director of the Buffalo Philharmonic and held that post until 1989.  During his time in Grand Rapids and Buffalo, Bychkov came to international attention. Following a series of high-profile cancellations in 1984 and 1985 that resulted in invitations to conduct the New York Philharmonic, the Berlin Philharmonic and the Royal Concertgebouw Orchestra.  He was subsequently signed to a 10-year recording contract with Philips Classics Records, and made his debut recording conducting the Berlin Philharmonic in Shostakovich's Symphony No. 5.

Career in Europe
From 1989 to 1998, Bychkov was music director of the Orchestre de Paris. He became Principal Guest Conductor of the Saint Petersburg Philharmonic Orchestra in 1990, principal guest conductor of the Maggio Musicale Fiorentino in 1992, chief conductor of Dresden's Semperoper in 1998 and chief conductor of the WDR Symphony Orchestra Cologne in 1997. He remained in Cologne until 2010, during which time he made a series of recordings including Brahms' Symphonies No. 1–4, Shostakovich's Symphonies Nos. 4, 7, 8, 10 and 11, Mahler's Symphony No. 3, Rachmaninov's The Bells and Symphonic Dances, Richard Strauss' Ein Heldenleben and Eine Alpensinfonie, Verdi's Requiem, as well as Strauss' Elektra, Daphne and Wagner's Lohengrin which won BBC Music Magazine's Record of the Year 2010.

Bychkov made his debut at the Royal Opera House, Covent Garden in 2003 with a new production of Elektra, and returned later that year to conduct Boris Godunov. In 2012, he assumed the newly created Günter Wand Conducting Chair with the BBC Symphony Orchestra, a post specially created for him. He holds the Otto Klemperer Chair of Conducting at the Royal Academy of Music in London.

In 2013, Bychkov first guest-conducted the Czech Philharmonic. With the orchestra, Bychkov is director of its Tchaikovsky Project. In October 2017, the Czech Philharmonic announced the appointment of Bychkov as its next chief conductor and music director, effective with the 2018-2019 season.  In September 2022, the Czech Philharmonic announced the extension of Bychkov's contract through 2028.

Bychkov was named Conductor of the Year by the International Opera Awards in 2015. He became an Honorary Member of the Royal Academy of Music (Hon RAM) in 2015 and received from the same institution an Honorary Doctorate of the University of London (Hon DMus) in 2022.

Personal life
Bychkov is married to the pianist Marielle Labèque, his second wife, and they live together on the Côte Basque French Basque country.

Selected discography

References

External links
Semyon Bychkov official website

Article 'Semyon Bychkov - The Maestro of Cologne'
 MusicalCriticism.com, Interview: Semyon Bychkov on returning to Covent Garden for Lohengrin, 25 April 2009
 Los Angeles Philharmonic page on Semyon Bychkov
Interview with Semyon Bychkov, November 28, 1988

Academics of the Royal Academy of Music
American male conductors (music)
Soviet conductors (music)
Jewish classical musicians
Mannes School of Music alumni
Soviet emigrants to the United States
Saint Petersburg Conservatory alumni
Musicians from Saint Petersburg
Soviet Jews
1952 births
Living people
Soviet defectors
20th-century American conductors (music)
21st-century American conductors (music)
Mannes College The New School for Music faculty
20th-century American male musicians
21st-century American male musicians